Dragan Punišić (Serbian Cyrillic: Драган Пунишић; born 1 March 1966 in Belgrade) is a retired Serbian footballer.

Punišić began his career in the Yugoslav First League with Red Star Belgrade. In 1991, he moved from NK Rijeka to CD Castellón.
He later had spells with S.C. Beira-Mar and S.C. Farense in the Portuguese Liga.

He won the 1987–88 Yugoslav First League with Red Star Belgrade and the 1988–89 Yugoslav First League with FK Vojvodina.

References

External links
 Biography on processosumarissimo.blogspot.com

1966 births
Living people
Yugoslav footballers
Serbian footballers
Serbian expatriate footballers
Red Star Belgrade footballers
FK Vojvodina players
HNK Rijeka players
Yugoslav First League players
CD Castellón footballers
Segunda División players
Expatriate footballers in Spain
S.C. Beira-Mar players
S.C. Farense players
Primeira Liga players
Expatriate footballers in Portugal
Association football midfielders